Vermont Route 64 (VT 64) is a  state highway in the U.S. state of Vermont, United States. It connects VT 12 in Northfield to VT 14 in Williamstown. Along the way it intersects Interstate 89 (I-89) in Williamstown.

Route description
VT 64 begins at VT 12 in the town of Northfield.

Major intersections

References

External links

064
Transportation in Orange County, Vermont
Transportation in Washington County, Vermont